Oro Bay Rural LLG is a local-level government (LLG) of Oro Province, Papua New Guinea.

Wards
01. Sariri
02. Gunimba
03. Jegerakambo
04. Emo
05. Banderi
06. Waiwa
07. Beama
08. Baberada
09. Dombada
10. Hanakiro
11. Kararata
12. Dobuduru
13. Barisari
14. Siremi
15. Buna
16. Killerton
17. Otobefari
18. Konje
19. Kausada
20. Jinanga
21. Bakumbari
22. Batari
23. Oure
24. Aure
25. Dewatutu
26. Bindari

References

Local-level governments of Oro Province